The Costa Rica least gecko (Sphaerodactylus graptolaemus) is a species of lizard in the family Sphaerodactylidae. It is endemic to Costa Rica and Panama.

References

Sphaerodactylus
Reptiles described in 1984